Harutaeographa kofka is a moth of the family Noctuidae. It is found in the Himalaya: Pakistan, northern India and Nepal.

References

Moths described in 1996
Orthosiini